Theofilos is a 1987 Greek drama film directed by Lakis Papastathis on the life of the Greek painter Theofilos Hatzimichail. It was entered into the 38th Berlin International Film Festival. The film was selected as the Greek entry for the Best Foreign Language Film at the 60th Academy Awards, but was not accepted as a nominee.

Cast
 Dimitris Katalifos as Theofilos Hatzimichail
 Manthos Athinaios
 Thodoros Exarhos
 Stamatis Fasoulis
 Irini Hatzikonstadi
 Dimitris Kaberidis
 Dimitris Katsimanis
 Anastasia Kritsi
 Constantine Lyras (as Dinos Lyras)
 Fraizi Mahaira
 Ivonni Maltezou
 Themis Manesis
 Stratos Pahis
 Stelios Pavlou
 Aris Petropoulos

See also
 List of submissions to the 60th Academy Awards for Best Foreign Language Film
 List of Greek submissions for the Academy Award for Best Foreign Language Film

References

External links

1987 films
1987 drama films
Greek drama films
1980s Greek-language films
Films shot in Lesbos